Samuel Ramey (born March 28, 1942) is an American operatic bass.

At the height of his career, he was greatly admired for his range and versatility, having possessed a sufficiently accomplished bel canto technique to enable him to sing the music of Handel, Mozart and Rossini, yet with power enough to handle the more overtly dramatic roles in Verdi, Puccini and Meyerbeer.

Early life

Ramey graduated from Colby High School in Colby, Kansas in 1960. He studied music in high school and in college at Kansas State University, as well as at Wichita State with Arthur Newman. In college at Kansas State, he was a member of the Kappa Sigma Fraternity.

After further study in Central City (where he was in the chorus of Don Giovanni in 1963, with Norman Treigle in the title role) and as an apprentice with the Santa Fe Opera, he went to New York City where he worked for an academic publisher before he had his first breakthrough at the New York City Opera, debuting on March 11, 1973, as Zuniga in the 1875 Bizet opera Carmen, after which, among other roles, he took over the Faustian devils in Gounod's Faust and Boito's Mefistofele vacated by the early death of Treigle.

As his repertoire expanded he spent more and more time in the theaters of Europe, notably in Berlin, Hamburg, London, Paris, Milan, Vienna and the summer festivals in Aix-en-Provence, Glyndebourne, Pesaro and Salzburg.

Later career
In January 1984, Ramey made his debut at the Metropolitan Opera in Handel's Rinaldo. He has since become a fixture at the Teatro alla Scala, Royal Opera House at Covent Garden, Vienna State Opera, the Paris Opera, the Lyric Opera of Chicago, the New York City Opera, the San Francisco Opera and the Teatro Colón in Buenos Aires (Attila, The Rake's Progress, Mefistofele).. In July 1985 he was cast as Bertram in the historic revival in Paris of Giacomo Meyerbeer's Robert le diable.

Ramey has sung in Mozart's Don Giovanni and The Marriage of Figaro and, in the bel canto repertoire, in Rossini's Semiramide, The Barber of Seville, Il Turco in Italia, L'italiana in Algeri, and La Gazza Ladra; in Donizetti's  Anna Bolena and Lucia di Lammermoor and Bellini's I puritani. In the dramatic repertoire, Ramey has been acclaimed for his "Three Devils": Boito's Mefistofele, Gounod's Faust and Berlioz's dramatic legend Damnation of Faust.

Other dramatic roles have included Verdi's Nabucco, Don Carlo, I masnadieri, I Lombardi and Jérusalem, as well as Offenbach's Tales of Hoffmann (portraying all four villains).

In 1990, he sang Joe in Jerome Kern's Show Boat in a concert performance at Avery Fisher Hall with Jerry Hadley and Frederica von Stade.

A number of previously obscure operas with strong bass/bass-baritone roles have been revived solely for Ramey, such as Verdi's Attila, Rossini's Maometto II and Massenet's Don Quichotte. He provided the voice for The Beast, the main antagonist of the 2014 animated miniseries Over the Garden Wall.

In 1996, Ramey gave a concert at New York's Avery Fisher Hall titled "A Date with the Devil" in which he sang 14 arias representing the core of this repertory.  He continued to tour this program throughout the world. In 2000, Ramey presented this concert at Munich's Gasteig Concert Hall. This performance was recorded live, and was released on compact disc in summer 2002.

He formerly served as a member of the faculty at Roosevelt University's Chicago College of Performing Arts and is currently a Distinguished Professor of Opera at Wichita State University's School of Music.

Ramey was named an inaugural member of the WSU College of Fine Arts Hall of Fame in 2015. He is a National Patron of Delta Omicron, an international professional music fraternity.

He reprised the title role of "Duke Bluebeard" in Opera Omaha's production of Béla Bartók's Bluebeard's Castle in April 2013 in Omaha, Nebraska.

Recordings
Ramey has made an exceptionally high number of recordings documenting many of his main operatic roles as well as collections of miscellaneous arias, other classical pieces, and crossover discs of popular American music. He has also appeared on television and video productions of the Met's productions of  Carmen and Bluebeard's Castle, San Francisco's production of Mefistofele, Glyndebourne's production of The Rake's Progress and Salzburg's production of Don Giovanni.

Family
He married his second wife, soprano Lindsey Larsen, on June 29, 2002.

Repertoire

Select discography
 Bernstein: On the Town, conducted by Michael Tilson Thomas, Deutsche Grammophon
 Massenet: Chérubin, conducted by Pinchas Steinberg, RCA Victor Red Seal
 Mozart: Le nozze di Figaro, conducted by Georg Solti, Decca
 Rossini: Otello, conducted by Jesús López Cobos, Philips
 Rossini: The Rossini Bicentennial Birthday Gala, conducted by Roger Norrington, EMI
 Marilyn Horne: Divas in Song, RCA Victor Red Seal
 A Salute to American Music (Richard Tucker Music Foundation Gala XVI, 1991), conducted by James Conlon, RCA Victor Red Seal
 Mozart: Don Giovanni, conducted by Herbert von Karajan, Deutsche Grammophon

Select videography
 The Metropolitan Opera Gala 1991, conducted by James Levine, Deutsche Grammophon

References

Sources
Samuel Ramey's website, samuelramey.com; retrieved January 25, 2010.
Ramey with Bach cantata recordings, bach-cantatas.com; retrieved July 25, 2010.
List of "Articles on Samuel Ramey", nytimes.com; retrieved July 25, 2010.
 Scovell, Jane, Samuel Ramey: American Bass, Baskerville Publishers, 2010;

YouTube
 On YouTube, singing THE MESSIAH
 73 year-old Samuel Ramey singing the role of Grand Inquisitor in DON CARLO.

1942 births
Living people
People from Colby, Kansas
Kansas State University alumni
Wichita State University alumni
American operatic bass-baritones
American operatic basses
Grammy Award winners
Singers from Kansas
Classical musicians from Kansas
Roosevelt University faculty
20th-century American male opera singers
21st-century American male opera singers